Hector Abbas (9 November 1884 – 11 November 1942) was a Dutch film actor who appeared mainly in British films after emigrating to the United Kingdom.

Partial filmography

 The First Men in the Moon (1919)
 A Prince of Lovers (1922)
 The Wandering Jew (1923)
 Bolibar (1928)
 The School for Scandal (1930)
 Madame Guillotine (1931)
 A Gentleman of Paris (1931)
 Rembrandt (1936)
 Gypsy Melody (1936)
 The Man Who Made Diamonds (1937)
 Old Mother Riley's Circus (1941)
 The Common Touch (1941)
 "Pimpernel" Smith (1941)
 One of Our Aircraft Is Missing (1942)

References

External links
 

1884 births
1942 deaths
Dutch male film actors
Male actors from Amsterdam
20th-century Dutch male actors
Dutch emigrants to the United Kingdom